Paul De Rolf (December 6, 1942 – June 22, 2017) was an American actor, choreographer, and dancer. In addition to his acting credits, De Rolf choreographed Steven Spielberg's 1941 (1979) and The Karate Kid Part II (1986), as well as the television series Petticoat Junction and The Beverly Hillbillies.

De Rolf began his career as a child actor. In 1955, he appeared opposite Bob Hope as one of the seven brothers in The Seven Little Foys. He was then cast as Eleazar, the nephew of Moses, in Cecil B. DeMille's 1956 epic film, The Ten Commandments. De Rolf transitioned to choreographer in the 1960s. He worked as choreographer and dancer for both television series, The Beverly Hillbillies and Petticoat Junction.

De Rolf was best known for creating the choreography for Steven Spielberg's 1979 period comedic film, 1941. He also choreographed The Karate Kid Part II, starring Ralph Macchio and Pat Morita, which was released in 1986.

Paul De Rolf taught dance at his studio in Los Angeles; his students included actor Tony Danza. He regularly performed with actor and dancer Donald O'Connor, who was best known for Singin' in the Rain (1952).

Paul De Rolf died from Alzheimer's disease in Australia on June 22, 2017, at the age of 74. He was survived by his wife Dorothy, a professional dance instructor, and his daughter, Chantal.

Filmography

References

External links

1942 births
2017 deaths
American choreographers
American male film actors
American male television actors
American male dancers
Dance teachers
20th-century American dancers